Samoan Braille is the braille alphabet of the Samoan language. It is a subset of the basic braille alphabet,

{| class=wikitable
|- align=center
|||||||||||||||||||||||||||||||||
|- align=center
|a||e||f||g||i||l||m||n||o||p||s||t||u||v||h||k||r
|}

supplemented by an additional letter  to mark long vowels:

{| class=wikitable
|- align=center
|||||||||
|- align=center
|ā||ē||ī||ō||ū
|}

Unlike print Samoan, which has a special letter ʻokina for the glottal stop, Samoan Braille uses the apostrophe , which behaves as punctuation rather than as a consonant.  (See Hawaiian Braille, which has a similar setup.)

Samoan Braille has an unusual punctuation mark, a reduplication sign .  This is used to indicate that a word is reduplicated, as in  segisegi "twilight".

References

French-ordered braille alphabets
Samoan language